So Fresh: The Hits of Autumn 2008  is a compilation album of songs that were popular in Australia. It was released on 29 March 2008.

Track listing

CD
 Leona Lewis – "Bleeding Love" (4:24)
 Rihanna – "Don't Stop the Music" (4:29)
 Timbaland featuring OneRepublic – "Apologize" (3:06)
 Alicia Keys – "No One" (4:15)
 Chris Brown – "With You" (4:14)
 Britney Spears – "Piece of Me" (3:32)
 Soulja Boy – "Crank That (Soulja Boy)" (3:44)
 Sean Kingston – "Me Love" (3:26)
 Rogue Traders – "I Never Liked You" (3:29)
 Delta Goodrem – "Believe Again" (4:08)
 Maroon 5 – "Won't Go Home Without You" (3:51)
 Avril Lavigne – "Hot" (3:23)
 Fergie – "Clumsy" (4:02)
 Colbie Caillat – "Bubbly" (3:18)
 Mika – "Big Girl (You Are Beautiful)" (4:08)
 Powderfinger – "Nobody Sees" (4:13)
 Shannon Noll – "In Pieces" (3:34)
 Good Charlotte – "Misery" (3:50)
 The Presets – "My People" (3:50)
 Fall Out Boy – "I'm Like a Lawyer with the Way I'm Always Trying to Get You Off (Me & You)" (3:33)

DVD
 Leona Lewis – "Bleeding Love"
 Rihanna – "Don't Stop the Music"
 Timbaland featuring OneRepublic – "Apologize"
 Alicia Keys – "No One"
 Britney Spears – "Piece of Me"
 Soulja Boy – "Crank That (Soulja Boy)"
 Sean Kingston – "Me Love"
 Rogue Traders – "I Never Liked You"
 Delta Goodrem – "Believe Again"
 Maroon 5 – "Won't Go Home Without You"
 Mika – "Big Girl (You Are Beautiful)"
 Fergie – "Clumsy"

Charts 
So Fresh: The Hits of Autumn 2008 peaked at #1 on the ARIA Compilations chart and ended up selling over 140,000 copies to be certified double platinum

Certifications

Notes 

So Fresh albums
2008 compilation albums
2008 video albums
Music video compilation albums
2008 in Australian music